Hosa Neeru is a 1986 Kannada-language film, directed by K. V. Jayaram and written by K. V. Raju. The film stars Anant Nag and Suhasini. It is considered one of the best movies by the Anant Nag and K. V. Jayaram duo. It is also the first movie for Suhasini with Anant Nag.

After marriage, a woman who is an engineering graduate decides to take up a job. However, she faces strong opposition from her father-in-law who does not want her to work.

The film score and soundtrack were composed by G. K. Venkatesh. The film was critically acclaimed and won multiple awards at the Karnataka State Film Awards for the year 1985–86.

Cast 
 Anant Nag as Krishnaprasad
 Suhasini as Bhavana
 Loknath as Krishnaprasad's father
 Lohithashwa as Principal 
 Pandari Bai as Bhavana's mother
 Shashikala as Krishnaprasad's Mother
 Jaggesh
 Dingri Nagaraj
 Chethan Ramarao
 Thimmaiah

Soundtrack 
The music was composed by G. K. Venkatesh, with lyrics by R. N. Jayagopal.

Awards
1985–86 Karnataka State Film Awards
 First Best Film
 Best Actor — Anant Nag
 Best Supporting Actress — Shashikala
 Best Music director — G. K. Venkatesh

Filmfare Awards South 
 Best Director – Kannada — K. V. Jayaram

References

External links 
 

1986 films
1980s Kannada-language films
Indian drama films
Films scored by G. K. Venkatesh